is a Japanese manga artist, born in Kanagawa Prefecture. She began her career as an author in 2000. It was also adapted into English and released to Blu-ray. It has also spawned several sequel works in 2007–20 including , O.B., and blanc, which also spawned audio dramas. In 2012, Nakamura released a mystery manga called Utsubora - A Story of a Novelist, which was translated and published into English by Vertical. Other major works include Kimiyoubi: Tetsudo Syoujo Manga 2, Kaori no Keishō , Ano Hi, Seifuku de , which have charted on Oricon's best-selling manga in 2015.

Works

Series
 , 2002
 , 2002
 , 20042006
 Classmates, published as:
 Dou Kyu Sei, 20062007
 Sotsu Gyo Sei – Winter, 2008
 Sotsu Gyo Sei – Spring, 2009
 Sora to Hara, 20092011
 O.B., 20122013
 Blanc (ブラン), 20182020
Home, 20202022
 Sajou Rihito no Chichi to Sono Buka, 2022present
 , 2007
 Nokemono to Hanayome (with Kunihiko Ikuhara), published as:
 Nokemono to Hanayome, 20072017
 Nokemono to Hanayome+, 20182020
 , 2008
 , 2008
 , 2009
 , 2010
 , 2013
 , 2010
 Utsubora: The Story of a Novelist, 20102012
 , 2013
 , 2015
  20112015
 , 2014
 , 2015
 , 2015
 , 2016
 , 2017present
 , 2017–present

Anthologies
 , 2012
 , 2012
 , 2013

References

External links
 

Manga artists
Manga artists from Kanagawa Prefecture
Living people
Year of birth missing (living people)